Machamer is a surname. Notable people with the surname include:

Christina Machamer (born 1982), American chef
Jefferson Machamer (1900–1960), American cartoonist and illustrator
Peter K. Machamer (born 1942), American philosopher and historian of science

Surnames of German origin